Sensibo is a manufacturer of air conditioning controllers.

History 
Sensibo was founded in November 2013 by Omer Enbar and Ran Roth.

The idea originated around 2004 when Omer Enbar had built a personal control system to activate his air conditioner via email prior to biking home from work. The system connected an IR blaster to a laptop that would send a signal to the AC every time he sent an email with the title "AC on" or "AC off".

During 2013, Omer Enbar and Ran Roth manually built and deployed several prototypes to friends and family. They later proceeded to found the company.

Crowdfunding and video 
In May 2014, Sensibo launched a successful crowdfunding campaign on Indiegogo. The campaign raised $165,000 on July 20, 2014. Its campaign video was later selected by Indiegogo as the funniest pitch video of 2014. The video, created by Tross Media and starring Michael Harpaz, has been often compared to Dollar Shave Club  and the TV series House of Cards.

Product launches 
Sensibo delivered on its crowdfunding campaign during the summer of 2015, shipping thousands of units worldwide, according to the company. In May 2015, Sensibo launched an IFTTT channel, allowing its system to interface with other apps and devices.  The devices are being distributed in many countries.

In January 2017 the company launched its 2nd generation device, Sensibo Sky.
Features include: 7-day scheduling, Location based on/off, Multiple users controlling a single device, integration with Amazon Echo and IFTTT.

References

Home automation companies
Companies established in 2014